Rico Wolven (born 25 Maart 1990) is a Dutch professional footballer who plays as a centre back for Spakenburg in the Dutch Topklasse. He formerly played for SC Heerenveen, FC Emmen, SC Veendam and Go Ahead Eagles.

External links
 Voetbal International 

1990 births
Living people
Dutch footballers
FC Emmen players
SC Veendam players
Go Ahead Eagles players
SV Spakenburg players
Eerste Divisie players
Derde Divisie players
People from Zwartewaterland
Association football defenders
Footballers from Overijssel